Walker Johnny da Silva Barra Souza (born March 30, 1992), best known as Johnny Walker, is a Brazilian professional mixed martial artist. He currently competes in the Light Heavyweight division in the Ultimate Fighting Championship (UFC). A professional competitor since 2013, Walker gained entrance into the UFC by competing on Dana White's Contender Series and also previously competed for Jungle Fight in his native Brazil. As of January 24, 2023, he is #7 in the UFC light heavyweight rankings.

Mixed martial arts career

Early career
Walker made his professional MMA debut in December 2013. Over the next four years, he fought in his native Brazil and earned a record of 10 wins against 3 losses with all of his wins coming via stoppages.

Walker ended up receiving an offer from a Scottish businessman to train there and moved to that country. However, after a month he received no pay and left. In early 2018, Walker made the move to England where he fought for various promotions and added 3 more wins to his record and earned a spot on Dana White's Contender Series in August 2018. Although from Brazil, Walker chose to represent England as he felt that is where he was able to reach his potential.

Dana White's Contender Series
Walker made his Dana White's Contender Series debut on August 11, 2018. He faced Henrique da Silva and won the fight via unanimous decision. The win earned Walker a spot on the UFC's roster.

Ultimate Fighting Championship
In his UFC promotional debut, Walker faced Khalil Rountree Jr. on November 17, 2018, at UFC Fight Night 140. He won the fight via knockout in the first round. The win earned Walker his first Performance of the Night bonus award.

In his next fight, Walker faced Justin Ledet on February 2, 2019, at UFC Fight Night 144. He won the fight via knockout just 15 second into the first round. The win earned Walker his second consecutive Performance of the Night bonus award.

In a quick turnaround, Walker replaced an injured Ovince Saint Preux to face Misha Cirkunov on March 2, 2019, at UFC 235. He won the fight via TKO in the first round. Post-fight, Walker stated he dislocated his shoulder during his celebration. The win also earned Walker his third consecutive Performance of the Night bonus award.

Walker faced Corey Anderson on November 2, 2019 at UFC 244. He lost the fight via technical knockout in the first round.

Walker faced Nikita Krylov on March 14, 2020 at UFC Fight Night 170. He lost the fight via unanimous decision.

Walker was initially scheduled to face Ryan Spann at UFC Fight Night 176 on September 5, 2020. However, Walker tested positive for COVID-19 and the bout was postponed to September 19, 2020 at UFC Fight Night 178. After being knocked down twice by Spann, Walker won the fight by knockout in the first round.

Walker was scheduled to face Jimmy Crute on March 27, 2021 at UFC 260. However, Walker pulled out of the fight in early February citing a chest injury.

Walker faced Thiago Santos on October 2, 2021 at UFC Fight Night 193. He lost the fight via unanimous decision.

As the first bout of his new six-fight contract, Walker faced Jamahal Hill on February 19, 2022 in the main event at UFC Fight Night 201. He lost the fight via knockout in the first round.

Walker faced Ion Cuțelaba on September 10, 2022 at UFC 279. He won the fight via a rear-naked choke submission in the first round. This win earned Walker his fourth Performance of the Night bonus award.

Walker faced Paul Craig on January 21, 2023, at UFC 283. He won the fight via technical knockout in the first round.

Walker is scheduled to face Anthony Smith on May 13, 2023 at UFC Fight Night 224.

Championships and accomplishments
Ultimate Fighting Championship
Performance of the Night (four times) 
MMAJunkie.com
2019 February Knockout of the Month vs. Justin Ledet
European Beatdown 
2018 EBD Light Heavyweight Championship (One time) 
Ultimate Challenge MMA 
2018 UCMMA Light Heavyweight Championship (One time)

Mixed martial arts record

|Win
|align=center|20–7
|Paul Craig
|TKO (punches)
|UFC 283
|
|align=center|1
|align=center|2:16
|Rio de Janeiro, Brazil
|
|-
|Win
|align=center|19–7
|Ion Cuțelaba
|Submission (rear-naked choke)
|UFC 279
|
|align=center|1
|align=center|4:37
|Las Vegas, Nevada, United States
|
|-
|Loss
|align=center|18–7
|Jamahal Hill
|KO (punch)
|UFC Fight Night: Walker vs. Hill
|
|align=center|1
|align=center|2:55
|Las Vegas, Nevada, United States
|
|-
|Loss
|align=center|18–6
|Thiago Santos
|Decision (unanimous)
|UFC Fight Night: Santos vs. Walker
|
|align=center|5
|align=center|5:00
|Las Vegas, Nevada, United States
|
|-
|Win
|align=center|18–5
|Ryan Spann
|KO (elbows and punches)
|UFC Fight Night: Covington vs. Woodley
|
|align=center|1
|align=center|2:43
|Las Vegas, Nevada, United States
|
|-
|Loss
|align=center|17–5
|Nikita Krylov
|Decision (unanimous)
|UFC Fight Night: Lee vs. Oliveira 
|
|align=center|3
|align=center|5:00
|Brasília, Brazil
|
|-
|Loss
|align=center|17–4
|Corey Anderson
|TKO (punches)
|UFC 244 
|
|align=center|1
|align=center|2:07
|New York City, New York, United States
|
|-
|Win
|align=center|17–3
|Misha Cirkunov
|TKO (flying knee and punches)
|UFC 235
|
|align=center|1
|align=center|0:38
|Las Vegas, Nevada, United States
|
|-
|Win
|align=center|16–3
|Justin Ledet
|TKO (spinning backfist and punches)
|UFC Fight Night: Assunção vs. Moraes 2
|
|align=center|1
|align=center|0:15
|Fortaleza, Brazil
|
|-
|Win
|align=center|15–3
|Khalil Rountree Jr.
|KO (elbow)
|UFC Fight Night: Magny vs. Ponzinibbio
|
|align=center|1
|align=center|1:57
|Buenos Aires, Argentina
|
|-
|Win
|align=center|14–3
|Henrique da Silva
|Decision (unanimous)
|Dana White's Contender Series Brazil 2
|
|align=center|3
|align=center|5:00
|Las Vegas, Nevada, United States
|
|-
|Win
|align=center|13–3
|Cheick Kone
|TKO (punches)
|European Beatdown 3
|
|align=center|1
|align=center|3:04
|Mons, Belgium
|
|-
|Win
|align=center|12–3
|Jędrzej Maćkowiak
|KO (knee and punches)
|Krwawy Sport 1: Southampton
|
|align=center|2
|align=center|2:42
|Southampton, England
|
|-
|Win
|align=center|11–3
|Stuart Austin
|KO (knee)
|Ultimate Challenge MMA 54
|
|align=center|1
|align=center|2:44
|London, England
|
|-
|Win
|align=center|10–3
|Rodrigo Jesus
|TKO (punches)
|Brave Combat Federation 8: The Rise of Champions
|
|align=center|1
|align=center|2:18
|Curitiba, Brazil
|
|-
|Win
|align=center|9–3
|Luis Guilherme de Andrade
|Submission (guillotine choke)
|Katana Fight: Gold Edition
|
|align=center|1
|align=center|0:29
|Colombo, Brazil
|
|-
|Loss
|align=center|8–3
|Henrique Silva Lopes
|KO (punches)
|Jungle Fight 88
|
|align=center|1
|align=center|0:18
|Poços de Caldas, Brazil
|
|-
|Win
|align=center|8–2
|Fábio Vasconcelos
|TKO (punches)
|Imortal FC 4: Dynamite
|
|align=center|1
|align=center|4:10
|São José dos Pinhais, Brazil
|
|-
|Loss
|align=center|7–2
|Klidson Abreu
|Submission (rear-naked choke)
|Samurai FC 12
|
|align=center|2
|align=center|3:10
|Curitiba, Brazil
|
|-
|Win
|align=center|7–1
|Murilo Grittz
|TKO (punches)
|PRVT: Garuva Top Fight
|
|align=center|1
|align=center|0:56
|Garuva, Brazil
|
|-
|Win
|align=center|6–1
|Marck Polimeno
|Submission (rear-naked choke)
|PRVT: Afonso Pena Top Fight 3
|
|align=center|1
|align=center|0:38
|São José dos Pinhais, Brazil
|
|-
|Win
|align=center|5–1
|Ricardo Pandora
|TKO (punches)
|Imortal FC 1: The Invasion
|
|align=center|1
|align=center|3:20
|São José dos Pinhais, Brazil
|
|-
|Win
|align=center|4–1
|Andrew Flores Smith
|TKO (punches)
|Peru Fighting Championship 21
|
|align=center|3
|align=center|0:28
|Lima, Peru
|
|-
|Loss
|align=center|3–1
|Wagner Prado
|TKO (punches)
|Team Nogueira Beach
|
|align=center|2
|align=center|3:40
|Rio de Janeiro, Brazil
|
|-
|Win
|align=center|3–0
|João Vitor Lopes da Silva
|TKO (punches)
|Gigante Fight MMA 2
|
|align=center|1
|align=center|N/A
|Rio de Janeiro, Brazil
|
|-
|Win
|align=center|2–0
|Vitor Casanova
|TKO (punches)
|Ubá Fight 5
|
|align=center|1
|align=center|4:38
|Ubá, Brazil
|
|-
|Win
|align=center|1–0
|Francisco Francisco
|TKO (knees and punches)
|Circuito Invictus de MMA 2
|
|align=center|1
|align=center|0:49
|Rio de Janeiro, Brazil
|
|}

See also
List of current UFC fighters
List of male mixed martial artists

References

External links

1992 births
Living people
Brazilian male mixed martial artists
Sportspeople from Rio de Janeiro (city)
Brazilian capoeira practitioners
Brazilian Muay Thai practitioners
Brazilian practitioners of Brazilian jiu-jitsu
Light heavyweight mixed martial artists
Mixed martial artists utilizing capoeira
Mixed martial artists utilizing Muay Thai
Mixed martial artists utilizing Brazilian jiu-jitsu
Ultimate Fighting Championship male fighters
Brazilian expatriates in England
Brazilian expatriate sportspeople in Thailand
People from Bedford Roxo